Olga Kalamba Tshilombo (born 24 April 2002) is a DR Congolese football forward, who plays in the Turkish Women's Super League for Dudullu Spor.  She was a member of the DR Congo women's national under-20 football team.

Club career 
Tshilombo played for Yanga Princess in Tanzania in 2022.

In January 2023, she moved to Turkey, and signed with the Istanbul-based club Dudullu Spor to play in the 2022–23 Super League season.

International career 
Tshilombo was a member of the DR Congo women's national under-20 football team, and took part in the 2022 African U-20 Women's World Cup Qualifying Tournament.

References 

2000 births
Living people
Democratic Republic of the Congo women's footballers
Women's association football forwards
Democratic Republic of the Congo women's international footballers
Democratic Republic of the Congo expatriate footballers
Expatriate women's footballers in Tanzania
Democratic Republic of the Congo expatriate sportspeople in Tanzania
Young Africans S.C. players
Expatriate women's footballers in Turkey
Democratic Republic of the Congo expatriate sportspeople in Turkey
Turkish Women's Football Super League players
Dudullu Spor players